Mount Pisgah is a mountain in Westmore, Vermont.  It is located on the east side of Lake Willoughby and constitutes the eastern side of "Willoughby Gap" ("Willoughby Notch"). It is part of the Northeastern Highlands of Vermont. There are hiking trails in Willoughby State Forest.
 
The cliffs contain alpine plants protected because no trails lead to or through them.

Hiking

There is a trail parking area located on the west side of Vermont Route 5A at the south end of Lake Willoughby. The trailhead is marked by a sign on the opposite side of the road.

Pulpit Rock also offers an expansive view of Lake Willoughby.

After leaving Pulpit Rock, the trail veers away from the cliffs to ascend to a viewing area on a rock slab.

The main hiking trail runs along a ridge bearing east away from the lake and curves back to the parking area. The descent trail offers three separate, small lookout areas.

See also
 Lake Willoughby
 Mount Hor (Vermont)

References

External links
 MountainZone.com
 Hike New England
 Peakbagger

Pisgah
Westmore, Vermont
Landforms of Orleans County, Vermont